Harold Buchman was a 20th-Century American Communist attorney, "the most important communist member" of the Progressive Citizens of America (founded by former vice president Henry A. Wallace, president of the Roosevelt Democratic Party Club, and treasurer for the Screen Writers Guild.

Career

Hollywood blacklist

His name appeared in the earliest Hollywood blacklist:  a list of Communist sympathizers along with Dalton Trumbo, Maurice Rapf, Lester Cole, Howard Koch, John Wexley, Ring Lardner Jr., Harold Salemson, Henry Meyers, Theodore Strauss, and John Howard Lawson.

On April 17, 1947, Buchman, actress Anne Revere, and writer Sam Moore pled the Fifth Amendment regarding questions about Communist affiliation.

Progressive Party

In January 1948, Buchman announced the Wallace for President Committee.  In February 1948, he became new executive secretary and Maryland state director of the Progressive Party.  In Summer 1948, when the Maryland attorney general rejected all filings by Progressive candidates for failure to sign loyalty oaths, Buch announced he would file a suit.

Communist counsel

In June-July 1951, Buchman counseled the follow out of more than 40 people subpoena-ed by HUAC:  Joseph Henderson and Philip Gran (June 21, 1951), Robert W. Lee (June 26, 1951), Irving Kandel (June 27, 1951), Sam Fox and Howard Bernard Silverberg (June 28, 1951), Louis Julius Shub (July 12, 1951), and Milton Seif and Irving Winker (July 13, 1951).

In March 1952, Buchman defended: Maurice Braverman,  George Meyers, Roy Wood, Dorothy Rose Blumberg (wife of Albert Blumberg), Philip Frankfeld, and Regina Frankfeld (all members of the Communist Party branch of Maryland and the District of Columbia).

Black Panthers

In 1971, Buchman defended Arthur F. Turco, Jr., a New York lawyer charged in connection with the 1969 torture and murder of a suspected Black Panthers police informer.

See also

 Screen Writers Guild
 Hollywood blacklist
 Henry A. Wallace
 Progressive Party (United States, 1948)
 CPUSA
 Maurice Braverman

References

Members of the Communist Party USA
American lawyers
Maryland socialists